is a Japanese biathlete. He competed in the 2018 Winter Olympics. He serves in the Japan Self-Defense Forces and is married to fellow biathlete Fuyuko Tachizaki.

References

1988 births
Living people
Biathletes at the 2018 Winter Olympics
Japanese male biathletes
Olympic biathletes of Japan
Asian Games medalists in biathlon
Biathletes at the 2017 Asian Winter Games
Medalists at the 2017 Asian Winter Games
Asian Games gold medalists for Japan
Asian Games bronze medalists for Japan